Polangui, officially the Municipality of Polangui,  is a 1st class municipality in the province of Albay, Philippines. According to the 2020 census, it has a population of  people.

Etymology 

The origin of the name Polangui has many versions. The foremost and seemingly more accepted version is, "that of a giant robust tree which existed majestically in the early municipal settlement". The natives of the settlement called the "Oyangue", which also served as the early landmark of the area whereby new settlers looked upon in their wandering. Similarly, the early Spanish frontier settlers found this tree and it became their famous settlement landmark. The settlement was then called "Binanuaan" but often referred to as "Oyangue" by nearby settlers. As more settlers came to dwell and engage in trade endeavors with the indigenous inhabitants, the more was the settlement known in distant areas by the name "Oyangue" (referring to the tree landmark) which was more widely accepted than "Binanuaan". The passing of generations corrupted the word "Oyangue" into several acronyms. Most acceptable and widely used before was "Polangue" and later "Polangui" which has remained today.

Another legend is about the story of a maiden named "Pulang Angui" which means "Red Maria" (Angui is the nickname for Maria) who loved red colors for dress and whose beautiful body, face and red lips became the object of affection by the males to the point of adoration. She was modest in her ways, talented for possessing various skills, with happy disposition, showing love of arts and religion. She would lead the tribe in festivities. When the Spaniards came, the soldiers who first set foot in Polangui asked for the name of the place. The native thought the foreigners was asking for the name of "Pulang Angui" and said so. The Spaniards recorded the name of the place as Pulangui, a concoction of the name which was later on, as years went by, was converted to Polangui.

History

Precolonial period 

Pre-colonial Polangui was a fertile valley cradled by the virgin forests of Mount Masaraga. It was formed out of five settlements ruled by the Datu of Ponso till the late 1583. The center of the settlements was called Banwang gurang, meaning "old town" and is now known as Magurang.

In 1584, Fray Baltazar de la Magdalena, left Ambos Camarines and stumbled upon this place west of Mount Masaraga. He found that each of the five settlements had about 100 inhabitants. In the same year, he founded a settlement within the fertile valley and established a ranch, which he called "Binanuaan". Being inland and strategically situated, the town was spared from the frequent raids of sea pirates as well as from the occasional destruction caused by the eruption of Mayon Volcano.

Polangui became a visita, or outreach village under the jurisdiction of the Villa Santiago de Libon, which was established in 1573 by Juan de Salcedo, the grandson of the Spanish conquistador Miguel Lopez de Legazpi. The villa, which lies south-west of Polangui, would be known as the fourth of its kind in the entire archipelago.

Fray de la Magdalena was credited with the founding of Polangui. Old manuscripts in the Archives of Manila and in the Franciscan Convent in Manila point to 1584 as the year Polangui was founded, and thus considered as one of the oldest municipalities in the Philippines.

Spanish regime 
By 1654, the original settlement became considerably bigger when Fray Alonzo de San Juan, was assigned in Polangui as "Encargado". The settlement was expanded reaching the present barangay sites in Lanigay, Ponso and Balinad. The town proper was established in Lanigay where a church made of wood was erected adjacent to about 280 wooden dwellings and more than 1,000 nipa huts. Unfortunately, this church together with the dwelling units was razed by a fire to the ground.

With the coming of another missionary, Fray Juan Bautista Marza, a new church made of bricks and stones was completed in 1664. This church stood on a new elevated site and still stands to this day. Under the leadership of Fray Marza, roads and bridges were also initiated and schools were introduced simultaneously with the Christian Doctrine and Spanish culture.

Growth of the settlement was so fast that it became a Poblacion and finally recognized as a Pueblo in 1674. Owing to its steady growth, a link with nearby Libon and Oas became a necessity. Hence, Fr. Jose Arnao, parish priest and Encargado from 1832 until 1852, directed the construction of roads and bridges that would connect Polangui to neighboring towns, including upland Buhi in Camarines Sur.

During Spanish regime, a significant highlight is the construction of its parish church which took 10 years to be completed starting in 1654 by Fray Alonzo de San Juan and completed in 1664 by Fray Juan Bautista Marza.

Polangueño martyr, Camilo Jacob, who is a photographer, was executed on January 4, 1897, with other Bicolanos. They are now commemorated as the Quince Martires del Bicolandia. A year later, the Spanish rule in Bicol ended with the mutiny of Guardia Civil in Naga led by Elias Angeles.

American period 
Sometime during the Philippine–American War, Polangui became the seat of the Provincial Government of Albay for a brief period under Governor Domingo Samson. When the Americans conquered Polangui in 1890 without firing a single shot, the form of government went through transition from military to civil government then Commonwealth system. The seat of the municipal government was in Ponso with Clemente Sarte as the acting Chief Executive. A few months later, the seat of the municipal government was transferred to Centro Occidental and still remains up to this day.

Japanese occupation 
When the Japanese forces occupied Polangui on December 13, 1941, Cipriano Saunar, then vice mayor of the Commonwealth government was appointed mayor by the Japanese military administration. A secret civil government was established simultaneously headed by Julian Saunar which was supported by the people. Cipriano Saunar's successor was Manuel Samson Sr. and in turn was succeeded by Jesus Salalima who ruled from 1947 to 1960.

Geography 

According to the Philippine Statistics Authority, the municipality has a land area of  constituting  of the  total area of Albay.

Polangui is bounded on the north by Buhi and Iriga City of Camarines Sur province, south by Libon, Oas and City of Ligao; and west by Malinao and the City of Tabaco.

Climate 

Polangui has a general climate characterized by dry season with a very pronounced maximum rainfall from November to December. Prevailing wind is in the general direction from north-east to south-west.

Barangays 
Polangui is politically subdivided into 44 barangays.

It is grouped into three divisions:
 Poblacion Barangays – 13 member barangays
 Rinconada Area Development Council (RADC) – 11 member barangays
 Upland Area Development Council (UADC) – 20 member barangays

Demographics

Language
Bikol Polangueño is the main dialect in Polangui, classified under Oasnon/West Miraya Bikol language. The majority of the population speak Tagalog and English. Other languages/dialects spoken are Bicolano Viejo and Bikol Rinconada (Agos-Matacon Area).

Religion
Christianity is the predominant religion with Roman Catholicism having the biggest practitioners. The four (4) Roman Catholic Parishes of Polangui is grouped as part of the Third Vicariate under the Roman Catholic Diocese of Legazpi. The Parishes are: 
Sts. Peter and Paul Parish in Barangay Centro Occidental (main parish)
St. Dominic Guzman Parish in Barangay Matacon
St. Anthony of Padua Parish in Barangay Ponso
Our Lady of Guadalupe Parish in Barangay Lidong

All of the barangays have their respective patron saints and barangay chapels.

Other Christian denominations present in the municipality include Protestants, Baptist, United Pentecostal Church, and Iglesia ni Cristo. Islam and Buddhism also have followers in the municipality.

Economy 

Polangui is classified as a first-class municipality as per DOF Order No. 20-05, dated July 29, 2005.

Agriculture
Its economy is still heavily dependent on agriculture. Major crops include rice, corn, cacao, pili, root crops, vegetables, coconuts and abacá. Poultry and livestock raising are also very much alive.

Shopping centers
Major business commercial establishments include the Bicol's largest mall chain, Liberty Commercial Center (LCC); and the Novo Asia Jeans and Shirts. The municipality has also attracted investments from national retail chains such as the recently opened Xentro Mall Polangui and SM Hypermarket. Other local establishments include Tri-Star Commercial, V5 General Merchandise, Angena Trading, and the recently opened Polangui 168 Enterprises.

Tourism and culture

Attractions 

Polangui provides a good view of Mount Mayon. The town hosts various historical and cultural tourism spots and other tourism-oriented recreation centers. Among these are:

Spring resorts
 Highlanders Watering Hole Resort is a "back-to-nature" vacation spot, located at Barangay Maynaga.
 Danny's Spring Resort at Barangay Balinad
 Kathleen's Paradise Resort at Barangay Agos
 Villa Sofia Resort (formerly La Oping Swimming Pool and Resort) at Barangay Gabon
 7 Hills Farm and Resort at Barangay Balinad

Public parks
 Sabido Park
 Parish Patio
 Kiwanis Children's Park

Nature parks
It is nestled between Mount Malinao and Mount Masaraga. The rare tabios or sinarapan (Mystichtys luzonensis), the world's smallest fish, is also cultured here. The lake is a 30-minute hike through carabao trails and abaca plantations.
 Saint Expeditus Eco-Park is part of the Zepeda Leisure Estates, located at Barangay Agos. Its primary activities such as nature trailing, birdwatching, horseback riding and camping, among others.
 Bastian Wildlife Center

Leisure and sports parks
 Zepeda Leisure Estates situated at Barangay Agos, offers a variety of amenities and facilities such as the Albay's first golf course, a driving range, a spring resort, camping grounds, lodge cabin, a restaurant, picnic area and a nature trail. Aside from playing golf and throwing in a picnic, available activities also includes pitch and putt, birdwatching and horseback riding.
 Polangui Tennis Club at Barangay Centro Occidental
 JGL Gamefarm at Barangay Ubaliw
 Salceda Sports Complex at Barangay Centro Oriental
 Polangui Oval at Barangay Centro Oriental (for renovation)

Festivals and events 

 Polangui Town Fiesta — started as "Oyangui Festival" in 2003 and later became "Pulang Angui Festival". It is an annual celebration of Polangueños during the whole month of June.
 Semana Santa (Holy Week) — The procession of pasos (Holy images) during Viernes Santo (Good Friday) has attracted devotees and local tourist alike because of the colorful and grandiose life-sized rebultos (statues) depicting the Passion of Christ and His resurrection installed on top of ornately decorated and lighter carrozas or cars. Many of the images and sculpture are of great antiquity and of magnificent artistry. Some of them are even centuries-old, like the image of St. Peter which dates back to 1857 as an heirloom piece.
 Karangahan sa Polangui — is Polangui's adaptation of the month-long celebration of the province's Karangahan sa Pasko: Albay Green Christmas, usually starting during the last week of November throughout December. Karangahan originated from the Bicolano term, ranga, which pertains to a higher level of joy and contentment; a term of endearment. The festival is aimed at the safety of both families and environment by means of an environment-friendly celebration which can be achieved through continued propagation and adherence to its original campaign which is the "plastic-free, smoke-free and zero casualty" advocacy and objectives of the province. Before it was even called Karangahan sa Polangui, Polangueños are already celebrating it as Tia Angui Festival, a concoction of the name of the town's maiden, Angui (Tiya Angui), from which the town derived its name. Likewise, it may be interpreted as tiangge, a local term for "bazaar", which flood the town's public market during Christmas season. Usually, it is a tight gridwork of crowded stalls peddling Christmas decorations, fireworks, fresh fruits, assorted toys, discounted clothes, jewelry, accessories, electronics, and handicrafts, in the hallways and other empty spaces.

Local products and delicacies 
 Calamay (sankaka) – also spelled kalamay which means "sugar", is a sticky sweet delicacy that is popular in many regions of the Philippines. It is locally known in Polangui as sankaka and is made of coconut milk, brown sugar, and ground glutinous rice. Kalamay can be eaten alone but is usually used as a sweetener for a number of Filipino desserts and beverages. The town's largest natural producer of sankaka is the Sarilla's Muscovado Milling Facility at Barangay Balaba.
 Rice Cakes
 Ibos – is made from glutinous rice cooked in coconut milk, and often steamed wrapped in buli or buri palm (Corypha) leaves. It is usually eaten sprinkled with sugar.
 Balinsuso – is a Bicolano suman made up of ground rice (ordinary or sticky rice), coconut milk, sugar and grated coconut. In other towns, they call it balisongsong.
 Binûtong – is made up of glutinous rice with coconut cream, wrapped in banana leaves. This is often served as breakfast or merienda, and best paired with hot chocolate or coffee. The term itself, probably came from  the root word "butok" or to "tie a knot" as the mouthwatering meal is wrapped and tied in layers of banana leaves in order to confine the flavors inside white it is being cooked. The banana leaves gives a wonderful flavor to the rice.
 Sinapot – is a local term for maruya. These are sliced bananas dipped in batter, deep fried and dredged in sugar. All are popular street food and is best eaten during merienda.
 Biniribid – is made from grated lukadon (young coconut)/coconut milk, and flour, topped with a mixture of kalamay and brown sugar. Its name is a Bikol term for twisted, as it is usually curled to form an eight much like twisted bread. Like the sinapot, it is also best eaten during merienda.
 Pili – Of the family Burseraceae, pili (Canarium ovatum) is native to the Philippines and can be found in especially in the Bicol region where it is an important crop and source of income of many families. Pili is a versatile nut being used for a variety of products. The nut kernel is the most important product. It can be eaten raw or roasted where its mild, nutty taste and tender-crispy texture can compare with and even found better than an almond. Pili kernel is also used in chocolate, ice cream, and baked goods. The young shoots and the fruit pulp are edible. The shoots are used in salads, and the pulp is eaten after it is boiled and seasoned. Boiled pili pulp resembles the sweet potato in texture, it is oily (about 12%) and is considered to have food value similar to that of avocado. Pulp oil can be extracted and used for cooking or as a substitute for cottonseed oil in the manufacture of soap and edible products. The stony shells are excellent fuel or growth medium for orchids and ornamental plants.

Cultural properties

Historical markers
This list contains an overview of the government-recognized historical markers installed by the National Historical Commission of the Philippines (NHCP) in Polangui that have been commemorated by cast-iron plaques permanently installed in publicly visible locations on buildings, monuments, or in special locations. While many cultural properties have historical markers installed, not all places marked with historical markers are designated into one of the particular categories of Cultural Properties.

Religious landmarks
 The Saints Peter and Paul Parish Church is located at Barangay Centro Occidental. It is one of the oldest Catholic churches in the Philippines, which took 10 years to finish. The church construction was started in 1654 by Fr. Alonzo de San Juan and was finished in 1664 under the management of Fr. Juan Bautista Marza.
 Santo Entierro Shrine
 Angustia / La Pieta Shrine

Monuments
 The Pedro Sabido Monument was constructed as a dedication to former Philippine Senator, Pedro Sabido, who was born in Polangui on October 19, 1894, to Don Juan D. Sabido and Doña Maximina Ribaya. His monument is located at the Sabido Park, beside the Office of the Sangguniang Bayan. A provincial road, the Pedro Sabido Road, was also dedicated in his honor. It serves as a major transport road which connects the municipality of Polangui to the municipalities of Oas, the City of Ligao and the First District of Albay.
 The Veterans' Memorial was constructed as a dedication to the fallen sons of Polangui who died and shed their blood during the Japanese military occupation in World War II. The memorial is located in front of the Polangui Tennis Club.
 Cristo Rey

Transportation

Airport
Philippine Airlines and Cebu Pacific Air operate in the airport, with daily flights to and from Manila and Cebu. The construction of the soon Polangui Domestic Airport at Barangay Balangibang is still under negotiation.

Seaport
Polangui is a landlocked municipality, entirely enclosed by land. The nearest ports from Polangui are Pantao Port in Libon, Pio Duran Port in Pio Duran, Legazpi Seaport in Legazpi City, and Tabaco International Seaport in Tabaco City.

Railways
In March 2012, the 10 1/2-hour Mayon Limited started traveling between Manila and Ligao City, but later ceased operations. In 2016, operation of the PNR Southrail Line resumed with one round trip between Naga City and Legazpi City, and served the town through the Polangui railway station. However, it was also stopped due to issues on maintenance and public safety.

Roads and bridges

Road network
Roads in Polangui are classified into:
 National roads
 Daang Maharlika (LZ/AH26)
 Albay West Coast Rd (N638)
 Matacon-Libon-Polangui Jct Rd
 Polangui Poblacion Rd
 Provincial roads
 Pedro Sabido Rd
 Buhi-Polangui Rd
 Municipal roads 
 Barangay roads

Mode of access
Polangui can be reached through land transport (by bus) from Manila in about 10 hours, two hours less if the new (Andaya Highway) route is taken. Main routes can be reached through by aircon buses, Garage to Terminal (GT) Vans and FX (location and access to is underway with the new Polangui Terminal), private cars, trimobiles, padyak and motorcycles. Some bus companies with stations in Polangui are:
 Alps
 Antonina Lines
 Cagsawa Travel & Tours
 DLTB Co.
 Executive Carriers
 Gold Line Tours, Inc.
 Peñafrancia Tours
 Philtranco
 Raymond Transportation
 RSL Bus Transport Corporation

In order to spur development in the municipality, the Toll Regulatory Board declared Toll Road 5 the extension of South Luzon Expressway. A 420-kilometer, four lane expressway starting from the terminal point of the now under construction SLEX Toll Road 4 at Barangay Mayao, Lucena City in Quezon to Matnog, Sorsogon, near the Matnog Ferry Terminal. On August 25, 2020, San Miguel Corporation announced that they will invest the project which will reduce travel time from Lucena to Matnog from 9 hours to 5.5 hours.

Communication

Radio stations
A local FM Station, Hot FM Polangui DWJJ 97.9 MHz, broadcasts live updates, news and entertainment. The municipality also receives signal from all major radio stations from Legazpi City and even Naga City in Camarines Sur.

TV stations
There is one TV relay station operating in the municipality (ABS-CBN). However, local TVs get strong signals from nearby Legazpi City and Naga City relay stations. Cable services are also offered in the area by two companies:
 Dream Cable Television (DCTV)
 Estevez Cable Television (ESTV)

Telephone
There are two existing telephone lines in Polangui:
 Bayan Telecommunications (BayanTel)
 Philippine Long Distance Telephone Company (PLDT)

Cellular telephone sites
The municipality is served by the Philippines' three main mobile phone carriers:
 Smart Communications
 Globe Telecom
 Sun Cellular

Education 
Presently, there are almost 20 Day Care Centers, 3 private pre-schools, 42 public elementary schools, 5 private elementary schools, 7 public high schools, 3 private high schools and 4 tertiary schools in the municipality.

Tertiary / vocational / technical education
The municipality has four tertiary schools:
 The Bicol University Polangui Campus (BUPC) is located in Barangay Centro Occidental, and used to be known as the School for Philippine Craftsmen and offered vocational courses. It was integrated into Bicol University, through R.A. 7722, R.A. 8292 & R.A. 8769, on December 14, 2000, and renamed as Bicol University Polangui Campus. From the five courses offered in 2000, it now offers fifteen courses including BS in Nursing, BS in Computer Engineering and BS in Electronics and Communications Engineering.
 The Polangui Community College (PCC) has four major program offerings: Associate in Hotel & Restaurant Management, Associate in Office Administration, Bachelor in Secondary Education and Bachelor of Science in Agribusiness.
 The Elite Fashion School, which offers technical and vocational courses. It is located at Barangay Centro Oriental, in front of the Land Bank of the Philippines- Polangui Branch.
 The Computer Arts and Technological (CAT) College, which was opened in 2012. It is located at the newly constructed commercial building at Barangay Ubaliw, beside the Polangui Terminal.

Secondary education

Public high schools
 The Polangui General Comprehensive High School is located in Barangay Centro Occidental, and started as Albay High School Polangui (AHSP) with Mr. Sisenando Reantaso as its first Principal (1948–1953). In 1963, President Diosdado Macapagal signed RA No. 3993 converting the AHSP into a community school, The Polangui General Comprehensive High School (PGCHS), a national secondary school patterned after the comprehensive high school in Detroit, Michigan U.S.A.
 Ponso National High School
 Matacon National High School
 Magpanambo National High School
 Itaran National High School
 La Medalla National High School
 Lanigay National High School
 Maysua High School

Private high schools
 Salle Learning Center at Barangay Centro Occidental
 Saint Peter's Academy at Barangay Centro Occidental
 Colegio de Santa Monica of Polangui, Inc. at Barangay Centro Occidental

Primary education

Public elementary schools

 Polangui South Central School at Barangay Centro Oriental, along the National Highway. It is the flagship school of the Polangui South District. Its satellite schools are the following:
 Agos Elementary School
 Alomon Elementary School
 Apad Elementary School
 Balangibang Elementary School
 Cotnogan Elementary School
 Kinale Elementary School
 Lanigay Elementary School
 La Medalla Elementary School
 La Purisima Elementary School
 Magpanambo Elementary School
 Magurang Elementary School
 Matacon Elementary School
 Santicon Elementary School
 Salvacion Elementary School
 San Roque Elementary School
 Santa Teresita Elementary School

 Polangui North Central School at Barangay Centro Oriental. It is the flagship school of the Polangui North District. Its satellite schools are the following:
 Alnay Elementary School
 Balaba Elementary School
 Balinad Elementary School
 Cepres Elementary School
 Cotmon Elementary School
 Dalogo Elementary School
 Danao Elementary School
 Itaran Elementary School
 Jose S. Duran Elementary School
 Kinuartelan Elementary School
 Lidong Elementary School
 Lourdes Elementary School
 Maynaga Elementary School
 Maysua Elementary School
 Mendez Elementary School
 Napo Elementary School
 Pinagdapugan Elementary School
 Pintor Elementary School
 Ponso North Elementary School
 Ponso South Elementary School
 Santa Cruz Elementary School
 Sugcad Elementary School
 Luis Severa Matza Elementary School

Private elementary schools
 Salle Learning Center at Barangay Centro Occidental
 Saint Peter's Academy at Barangay Centro Occidental
 Global Vision Excellence School at Barangay Basud
 Polangui SDA Multigrade School at Barangay Basud
 Colegio de Santa Monica of Polangui, Inc. at Barangay Centro Occidental

Day care and pre-school

Private Pre-schools
 Salle Learning Center at Barangay Centro Occidental
 Saint Peter's Academy at Barangay Centro Occidental
 Global Vision Excellence School at Barangay Basud
 Saint Noah's Learning Center at Barangay Magurang
 Golden Wisdom Proverbial School at Barangay Gabon

Public services

Healthcare
The present health services of the municipality are administered by 2 Municipal Health Officers, 2 Public Health Nurses, 1 Medical Technologist, 1 Dentist, and 12 Midwives.

Aside from the Municipal Health Office and Barangay Health Stations, there are 2 Private Hospitals (Isip General Hospital in Gabon and Perillo General Hospital in Magurang), and 14 clinics that provide alternative health services to the population of the municipality. Polangui is equipped with 6 ambulances- 1 in the Rural Health Unit (RHU), 2 in the municipal hall, and 3 in the health station centers in Balinad, Itaran and Matacon.

The Basic Emergency Obstetric and Newborn Care (BEmONC) Birthing Facility at RHU-Polangui specializes in maternal healthcare, along with several lying-in and birthing clinics. Polangui's BEmONC Birthing Facility is a PhilHealth-accredited institution and offers free services to cardholders.

A new medical establishment recently opened its doors- the Our Lady of Perpetual Help Diagnostic and Dialysis Center at Barangay Centro Oriental, in front of the Polangui South Central Elementary School. Polangui and Legazpi City are the only ones in Albay who have a dialysis facility.

Waste disposal
In dealing with solid waste management, the Municipality of Polangui has adopted the usual means of dumping garbage in an open-pit dumpsite. Garbage is collected from each barangay in the poblacion every Tuesday and Friday. The municipality has four garbage trucks to ensure that the garbage is collected and disposed in the waste disposal site located at Sitio Barobo, about  distance from the central business district.

Fire protection
The Polangui Fire Station, Bureau of Fire Protection is located at Barangay Centro Occidental, between the Municipal Hall and the Polangui Police Station. The Polangui BFP is headed by Fire Marshal SINSP MARC ALLAN C CONSUEGRA.

Police and law enforcement
Polangui PNP is headed by PSI Edgar Azotea

Penology
The Polangui District Jail is manned by officers of the Bureau of Jail Management and Penology (BJMP), headed by Jail Warden Sr. Insp. Alfredo R. Ricaford, Jr.

Utilities

Power
The Albay Power and Energy Corporation (APEC) Sub-Station 2 in Barangay Centro Occidental provides electricity to the majority of the town's barangays.

Water
Water supply is managed by the Polangui Waterworks Services Administration (POWASA), inaugurated by President Gloria Macapagal Arroyo, located at Barangay Balinad. Its present service area encompasses the poblacion and some of the other barangays. The rest of the residents, most especially those in the upland and rural areas are still dependent on shallow wells, deep wells or springwater.

Burial grounds
There are 7 cemeteries in the municipality:

 Polangui Catholic Cemetery in Barangay Sugcad
 Our Garden of Faith Memorial Park in Barangay Sugcad
 Polangui Chinese Cemetery in Barangay Sugcad
 Parish Ossuary in Barangay Centro Occidental
 Parish Cemetery in Barangay Lidong
 Parish Cemetery in Barangay Matacon
 Parish Cemetery in Barangay Ponso

Government

Elected officials

 Legend
 A  indicates that the official is elected for the first term
 A  indicates that the official is re-elected to a higher position
 A  indicates that the official is re-elected to the same position

Past municipal administrators

Awards and recognitions

Notable personalities

 Pedro R. Sabio — Former Philippine Senator, Former Philippine Ambassador to Spain and the Vatican, Former Albay 3rd District Representative (1922–1925, 1925–1928, 1928–1931, 1931–1934, 1935–1938, 1938–1941)
 Jose Ma. Clemente "Joey" S. Salceda — Albay 2nd District Representative (2016–present), Former Albay Provincial Governor (2007–2016), Former Albay 3rd District Representative (1998–2001, 2001–2004, 2004–2007), Malacañang Chief of Staff (February 10, 2007 – March 29, 2007)
 Reno G. Lim — Former Albay 3rd District Representative (2007–2010)
 Dianne Elaine S. Necio — Binibining Pilipinas International 2011, Binibining Pilipinas 2010 First Runner-up, Miss Tabak 2009, Mutya ng Bicolandia
 Rodolfo "Rudy" Agapay Salalima — First Secretary of the Department of Information and Communications Technology (DICT), Former Chief Legal Counsel and Senior Advisor of Globe Telecom, Former Senior Vice President for Corporate and Regulatory Affairs and Managing Director of Ayala Corporation, Former President of the Philippine Chamber of Telecommunications Operators (PCTO) and International Telecommunication Union Council Working Group for the Amendment of ITU Constitution and Convention Vice Chairman for Asia-Pacific Region

Sister cities
Local
  General Santos - signed on May 19, 2021

References

External links

 [ Philippine Standard Geographic Code]

Municipalities of Albay